Nurd may refer to:

 Mi-2/NuRD complex
 Alternative spelling of Nerd

See also 
 Nerd (disambiguation)
 Nurds, 1980 studio album by the Roches